Secundianus of Singidunum was bishop of Singidunum (in the Roman province of Dacia, modern Belgrade). Little is known of his life; except that he was condemned for heresy at the Council of Aquileia (in the northeast of modern Italy) in 381.

Palladius of Ratiaria (province of Dacia, modern Bulgaria) had been assured by Gratian, the senior Roman emperor, that several bishops from the Eastern Empire, a stronghold of Arianism, would attend the Council. He had been deceived. Saint Ambrose had persuaded Gratian to change its original purpose. Palladius and his friend Secundianus were outnumbered at Aquileia by thirty-four to two, and found themselves on trial. The charge against them was that they believed God the Son to be subordinate to God the Father; instead of being of equal rank, as stipulated in the Nicene Creed of 325.

From the Council, Ambrose wrote to Gratian: 

No record of what action Gratian took seems to have survived; but it seems likely that if he had taken none, Ambrose would have sent a reminder.

Notes

References

Date of birth unknown
Place of birth unknown
Date of death unknown
Place of death unknown
Arian bishops
4th-century Arian Christians
4th-century Romans
Roman Dacia